101 Squadron or 101st Squadron may refer to:

 No. 101 Squadron IAF, a unit of the Indian Air Force
 No. 101 Squadron RAF, a unit of the United Kingdom Royal Air Force
 101 Squadron SAAF, a unit of the South African Air Force
 101 Squadron (Israel), a unit of the Israeli Air Force
 101 Squadron (Portugal), a unit of the Portuguese Air Force
 101st Squadron (JASDF), a unit of the Japan Air Self-Defense Force
 101st Aero Squadron, a unit of the  Air Service, United States Army
 101st Bombardment (Photographic) Squadron, a unit of the United States Army Air Forces
 101st Observation Squadron, later 101st (Tactical) Reconnaissance Squadron, a unit of the United States Army Air Forces
 101st Fighter Squadron, a unit of the United States Air Force
 101st Intelligence Squadron, a unit of the United States Air Force
 101st Rescue Squadron, a unit of the United States Air Force
 VF-101 (Fighter Squadron 101), a unit of the United States Navy
 VMFAT-101 (Marine Fighter Attack Training Squadron 101), a unit of the United States Marine Corps

See also

 101st Division (disambiguation)
 101st Brigade (disambiguation)
 101st Regiment (disambiguation)
 101st Battalion (disambiguation)